Alex Kemp can refer to:

 Alex Kemp (cricketer) (born 1988), Australian cricketer
 Alex Kemp (footballer), Scottish footballer
 Alex Kemp (American football official)